Thomas Powell Symonds (1762 – 19 August 1819) was Member of Parliament (MP) for Hereford 1800 to 1819, and lieutenant colonel of the South Gloucester Militia.

Thomas Powell Symonds was the eldest son of Thomas Symonds Powell Symonds of Pengethley Manor  (near Ross) and his wife Sarah Mary Rootes, daughter of Joseph Chester of Gloucester.  He was the eldest of eight children and inherited Pengethley Manor from his father in 1793. He was appointed High Sheriff of Herefordshire for 1798–99.

He married a Mary Rootes and fathered 7 sons he was succeeded by his nephew, also Thomas Powell Symonds (son of Rev Joseph Symonds—T.S.P. Symonds' second son).

Coat of arms
Coat of arms: Sa, a dolphin embowed holding in the mouth a fish arg.
Crest: A dolphin as in the arms.

References

External links 
 

1762 births
1819 deaths
Members of the Parliament of Great Britain for English constituencies
British MPs 1796–1800
Members of the Parliament of the United Kingdom for English constituencies
UK MPs 1801–1802
UK MPs 1802–1806
UK MPs 1806–1807
UK MPs 1807–1812
UK MPs 1812–1818
UK MPs 1818–1820
High Sheriffs of Herefordshire